Flekkerøy Idrettslag, also called Fløy is a Norwegian sports club from Flekkerøy in Kristiansand. It has sections for association football and team handball, in addition to cross-country skiing and racket sport.

Football
The men's football team currently plays in the 2. divisjon, the third tier of the Norwegian football league system, after winning promotion from the 2019 3. divisjon. Flekkerøy stadium is their home ground. Their team colors are blue and white.

Recent seasons

Source:

References

 Official site 

 
Football clubs in Norway
Sport in Kristiansand
Association football clubs established in 1950
1950 establishments in Norway